Trust, but verify is a rhyming Russian proverb. The phrase became internationally known in English after Suzanne Massie, an American scholar, taught it to Ronald Reagan, then president of the United States, the latter of whom used it on several occasions in the context of nuclear disarmament discussions with the Soviet Union.

Soviet–American relations 

Suzanne Massie, an American scholar, met with Ronald Reagan many times while he was president of the United States between 1984 and 1987. She taught him the Russian proverb  meaning 'trust, but verify'. She advised him that "The Russians like to talk in proverbs. It would be nice of you to know a few. You are an actor – you can learn them very quickly." The proverb was adopted as a signature phrase by Reagan, who used it frequently when discussing United States relations with the Soviet Union.

After Reagan used the phrase to emphasize "the extensive verification procedures that would enable both sides to monitor compliance with the treaty", at the signing of the INF Treaty, on 8 December 1987, his counterpart General Secretary Mikhail Gorbachev responded, "You repeat that at every meeting". To this, Reagan answered, "I like it". While Reagan quoted Russian proverbs, Gorbachev quoted Ralph Waldo Emerson, who had been popular in the USSR when Gorbachev was in college, saying that "the reward of a thing well done is to have done it."

Following the 2013 Ghouta attacks, Secretary of State John Kerry told a news conference in Geneva that the United States and Russia had agreed on a framework to dispose of Syria's chemical weapons. He said "President Reagan's old adage about 'trust but verify' ... is in need of an update. And we have committed here to a standard that says 'verify and verify'."

Influence 
In 1995, the similar phrase "Trust and Verify" was used as the motto of the On-Site Inspection Agency (now subsumed into the Defense Threat Reduction Agency).

In 2000, David T. Lindgren's book about how interpretation, or imagery analysis, of aerial and satellite images of the Soviet Union played a key role in superpowers and in arms control during the Cold War was titled Trust But Verify: Imagery Analysis in the Cold War.

In 2001, the National Infrastructure Protection Center (NIPC), a national critical infrastructure threat investigation and response entity, published a paper entitled "Trust but verify" on how to protect oneself and their company from email viruses.

In 2015, both Democrats and Republicans invoked the phrase when arguing for and against the proposed Iran nuclear deal framework.

In the study of programming languages, the phrase has been used to describe the implementation of downcasting: the compiler trusts that the downcast term will be of the desired type, but this assumption is verified at runtime in order to avoid undefined behavior.

In 2019, this quote was used in third episode of HBO miniseries Chernobyl, by the first deputy chairman of the KGB.

The phrase has been used in relation to India–China border disputes and also following the Galwan clash during the 2020 China–India skirmishes. Variants of the phrase were also reported in the Indian media, "distrust until fully and comprehensively verified", and "verify and still not trust".

On July 24, 2020, US Secretary of State Michael Pompeo referenced the proverb in a speech at the Richard Nixon Presidential Library saying that in dealing with China, the United States must instead 'distrust and verify'.

Origins 

The origin of the phrase is obscure but understood to be a paraphrase of Vladimir Lenin and Joseph Stalin.

Lenin raised postulates of similar wording and meaning in a number of early publications:
 "Put no faith in words; subject everything to the closest scrutiny—such is the motto of the Marxist workers" (Russian: "Не верить на слово, проверять строжайше — вот лозунг марксистов рабочих")
 "To test men and verify what has actually been done— this, this again this alone is now the main feature of all our activities, of our whole policy" (Russian: "Проверять людей и проверять фактическое исполнение дела —  в этом теперь гвоздь всей работы").
 In another 1917 publication "How to organise competition" Lenin highlights the need for strict and mutual "accounting and control" on all layers of the socialist society, repeating these terms overall nine times across the article.

Stalin said in an interview with Bela Kun:
 "Healthy distrust makes good base for cooperation" (Russian: "Здоровое недоверие — хорошая основа для совместной работы").

See also 
 Distrust
 Zero trust security model

Notes

References

External links 
 Trust but verify excerpt from Reagan and Gorbachev press conference

Ronald Reagan
Russian proverbs
Russian words and phrases
American political catchphrases
Cold War history of the United States